The Uralic Phonetic Alphabet (UPA) or Finno-Ugric transcription system is a phonetic transcription or notational system used predominantly for the transcription and reconstruction of Uralic languages. It was first published in 1901 by Eemil Nestor Setälä, a Finnish linguist.

UPA differs from the International Phonetic Alphabet (IPA) notation in several ways.

The basic UPA characters are based on the Finnish alphabet where possible, with extensions taken from Cyrillic and Greek orthographies. Small-capital letters and some novel diacritics are also used.

Unlike the IPA, which is usually transcribed with upright characters, the UPA is usually transcribed with italic characters. Although many of its characters are also used in standard Latin, Greek, Cyrillic orthographies or the IPA, and are found in the corresponding Unicode blocks, many are not. These have been encoded in the Phonetic Extensions and Phonetic Extensions Supplement blocks. Font support for these extended characters is very rare; Code2000 and Fixedsys Excelsior are two fonts that do support them. A professional font containing them is Andron Mega; it supports UPA characters in Regular and Italics.

Vowels
A vowel to the left of a dot is illabial (unrounded); to the right is labial (rounded).

Other vowels are denoted using diacritics.

The UPA also uses three characters to denote a vowel of uncertain quality:
  denotes a vowel of uncertain quality;
  denotes a back vowel of uncertain quality;
  denotes a front vowel of uncertain quality

Consonants
The following table describes the consonants of the UPA.

When there are two or more consonants in a column, the rightmost one is voiced; when there are three, the centre one is partially devoiced.

ʔ denotes a voiced velar spirant.

ᴤ denotes a voiced laryngeal spirant.

Modifiers

For diphthongs, triphthongs and prosody, the Uralic Phonetic Alphabet uses several forms of the tie or double breve:
 The triple inverted breve or triple breve below indicates a triphthong
 The double inverted breve, also known as the ligature tie, marks a diphthong
 The double inverted breve below indicates a syllable boundary between vowels
 The undertie is used for prosody
 The inverted undertie is used for prosody.

Differences from IPA and UPA and languages
A major difference is that IPA notation distinguishes between phonetic and phonemic transcription by enclosing the transcription between either brackets  or slashes . UPA instead used italics for the former and half bold font for the latter.

For phonetic transcription, numerous small differences from IPA come into relevance:
 UPA e, o denote mid vowels  with no particular bias towards open or close, as are found in most Uralic languages. IPA ,  denote close-mid vowels in particular, common in Romance and West Germanic languages. 
 Being designed for languages largely featuring vowel harmony, UPA has no simple way to denote a basic, backness-ambiguous schwa sound, IPA .  denotes a reduced form of e, corresponding with IPA .
 For the voiced dental fricative, UPA uses a Greek delta , while IPA uses the letter eth . In UPA, eth  stands for an alveolar tap, IPA .
 UPA uses Greek chi χ for the voiceless velar fricative.
 UPA uses small caps for voiceless or devoiced sounds (…), while in IPA, these frequently occur as distinct basic characters denoting entirely separate sounds (e.g. ).
 UPA does not systematically distinguish approximants from fricatives. j may stand for both the palatal approximant (IPA ) or the voiced palatal fricative (IPA ), v may stand for both the labiodental approximant (IPA ) or the voiced labiodental fricative (IPA ), β may stand for the bilabial approximant (IPA ), the voiced bilabial fricative (IPA ), or in broad transcription even the labiovelar approximant (IPA ).
 UPA lacks a series of palatal consonants: these must be transcribed by either palatalized alveolar or palatalized velar symbols.

Examples:

Sample
This section contains some sample words from both Uralic languages and English (using Australian English) along with comparisons to the IPA transcription.

See also 
 Americanist phonetic notation

Literature

References

Phonetic alphabets
Unicode
Uralic languages